The 2007 Jelajah Malaysia, a cycling stage race that took place in Malaysia. It was held from 6 to 12 January 2007. There were seven stages with a total of 863.8 kilometres. In fact, the race was sanctioned by the Union Cycliste Internationale as a 2.2 category race and was part of the 2006–07 UCI Asia Tour calendar.

Mehdi Sohrabi of Iran won the race, followed by Hossein Askari of Iran second and Thomas Just (cyclist) of Denmark third overall. Anuar Manan of Malaysia won the points classification and Ghader Mizbani of Iran won the mountains classification.  won the team classification.

Stages

Final standings

General classification

External links
 
 Palmares at cyclingarchives.com
 Results at cqranking.com

Jelajah Malaysia
Jelajah Malaysia
Jelajah Malaysia